Ade Supandi (born 26 May 1960) is a retired admiral in the Indonesian Navy who formerly served as its chief of staff (abbreviated KSAL or Kasal). Previously, he had been the General Chief of Staff of the Indonesian National Armed Forces and the commander of the navy's eastern fleet.

Career
Ade graduated from the Indonesian Naval Academy in 1983. He passed through multiple positions, including the governor of the Naval Academy in 2010 and commander of the Eastern Fleet Command before being appointed to the post of the KSAL's budgeting and planning assistant. He was transferred to be TNI's General Chief of Staff on 12 March 2014, before being appointed by Joko Widodo as KSAL on 31 December. He was promoted to the rank of admiral on 3 February 2015.

After his retirement, he was replaced by Siwi Sukma Adji on 22 May 2018. He remarked that he "was not yet interested" in entering politics.

Awards

National

 Bintang Yudha Dharma Pratama

 Bintang Yudha Dharma Nararya

 Bintang Jalasena Pratama

 Bintang Jalasena Nararya

Foreign awards
 Pingat Jasa Gemilang

 Order of National Security Merit - First Class

See also
Indonesian military ranks
Mulyono, army chief of staff

References

1961 births
Living people
Indonesian admirals
People from Bandung
Chiefs of Staff of the Indonesian Navy
Sundanese people